Mirza Riyaz Ul Effendi is an Indian politician currently serving as a Member of the Telangana Legislative Council since 2019. He is a member of the All India Majlis-e-Ittehadul Muslimeen. He was corporator from Dabeerpura (Ward No: 30) of GHMC.

Early life and education 
Mirza Riyaz Ul Effendi was born to Mirza Sayeedul Hasan Parvez Effendi and Khadija Begum Effendi on 26 July 1977. He completed his bachelor's degree in commerce.

Political career 
In 2009, Mirza Riyaz Ul Effendi got elected as a corporator of Noor Khan Bazaar Division in GHMC and in 2016, he got elected as a corporator from Dabeerpura (Ward No: 30) of GHMC. Later in 2019, he got elected as the Member of Telangana Legislative Council  (MLC) under the MLAs quota by getting 19 votes.

Positions held

References

Living people
Telangana politicians
All India Majlis-e-Ittehadul Muslimeen politicians
People from Telangana
1977 births